Milan Singh Ongnam (born 15 May 1992) is an Indian professional footballer who plays as a midfielder for Mohammedan.

Career

Pailan Arrows
During the summer of 2010 Singh signed with Pailan Arrows who were then AIFF XI in the I-League. He scored his first goal for the team against his former club  East Bengal on 26 February 2011. After the 2010–11 season Singh reportedly went back to East Bengal but was rejected during pre-season and ultimately ended back at Pailan Arrows for the 2011–12 season. He scored his second ever goal for Pailan Arrows on 3 December 2011 against Mumbai F.C. in the I-League.

2012–13 season
Singh began the season for Pailan Arrows during their first official tournament, the 2012 Durand Cup, with a goal in his first game of the season against Delhi United in the first match of the tournament for Pailan Arrows to help Arrows draw 2–2. Singh then played in two of the three matches for Pailan Arrows in their second tournament, the 2012 Indian Federation Cup.

Singh then opened his 2012-13 I-League campaign with a goal from the penalty spot as Pailan opened their campaign with a victory which was also the first I-League victory for new coach Arthur Papas. Singh then scored his second goal of the season, again from the penalty spot, in the 69th minute against Air India on 11 October 2012 to help Pailan Arrows win the match 2–1. Pailan however went on a run of bad form during the month of November and for Singh the month was summed up after he received a yellow card in Pailan's 3–1 loss to Shillong Lajong F.C. on 28 November 2012.

Singh then began the month of December in fashion by putting in a man of the match performance for Pailan Arrows in a 4–1 victory over ONGC F.C. in which Singh scored in the 57th minute from the penalty spot. Singh then scored again for Pailan Arrows on 22 December 2012 against Dempo from the penalty spot again but that was not enough as Pailan fell 2–1 to the reigning champions.

Shillong Lajong
On 19 May 2013, media revealed that Milan is going to join Shillong Lajong for next two-year. 
He made his debut for Shillong Lajong in the I-League on 22 September 2013 against Dempo S.C. at the Duler Stadium in which he played the whole match as Shillong Lajong won 0–3.

Milan represented North East United FC during the 2014 ISL

DSK Shivajians
Milan signed for I-League new entrants DSK Shivajians for season 2015-16. He played 12 games for the Pune based clubs including starting 10 of those 12 games. At the end of the season his contract was renewed for a further season.

Delhi Dynamos (loan)
Indian Super League opportunity came calling again for Milan as he was signed on loan by the Delhi based ISL side. On July 18, 2016 Delhi Dynamos announced that Milan would be joining the side for 2016 edition of the Indian Super League 
Coached by Italian legend and World Cup winner Gianluca Zambrotta, Milan made 15 starts for the side scoring 2 important goals against Pune City FC & Atletico de Kolkata. He had a standout ISL as Delhi Dynamos made it to the Semi-Finals while Milan was regarded as one of the stand-out Indian players in the league

Kerala Blasters
On 23 July 2017, Singh was selected in the 5th round of the 2017–18 ISL Players Draft by the Kerala Blasters for the 2017–18 Indian Super League season. He made his debut for the club on 17 November 2017 against ATK. He started and played the full match as Kerala Blasters drew 0–0.

International

Youth
On 23 June 2012, Singh made his debut for the India U23 team during the qualifying round of the 2013 AFC U-22 Asian Cup against Lebanon U23 in which India U23 won 5–2.

Senior
He made his senior team debut on 22 March 2017 in the friendly against Cambodia, which India won by 3–2.

Career statistics

International

Honours
Mohammedan Sporting
Calcutta Football League: 2021
Durand Cup runner-up: 2021

References

External links

Indian footballers
1992 births
Living people
Footballers from Manipur
India international footballers
India youth international footballers
I-League players
Calcutta Football League players
Indian Arrows players
Shillong Lajong FC players
DSK Shivajians FC players
Indian Super League players
NorthEast United FC players
Odisha FC players
Kerala Blasters FC players
Association football midfielders
Footballers at the 2010 Asian Games
Footballers at the 2014 Asian Games
Asian Games competitors for India
Mohammedan SC (Kolkata) players